The Riverfront is an urban development in Downtown Miami, Florida, United States. The complex is located on the north bank of the Miami River in Miami's Central Business District. The complex contains three main towers, "Mint" and "The Ivy" and "Wind." The taller of the three, Mint, is currently the 6th-tallest building in Miami and Florida. It has 55 floors and rises .

History 

The Ivy opened in July, 2008. Ivy and Mint are developed by Key International. The third tower, Wind, was developed by Neo. Construction began in 2007 and the tower was completed 2009.

"Cima" tower was proposed for the southeast corner of the Riverfront Complex but was never built. It was proposed to begin in 2006 and be completed by 2008. The tower was proposed to have 471 residential units with a height of 52 floors.

The Riverfront Retail Center was proposed to connect the buildings at the lower floors and was to be dedicated to retail. The towers were to be used for condominiums, apartments, and office space. The Miami Riverwalk and the Riverwalk Metro Station would have been incorporated into the development. The complex is bordered by Southwest 3rd Street to the north, the Miami River to the south, Southwest 1st Avenue to the east, and Southwest 4th Avenue to the west. It is served by the Riverwalk and Miami Avenue Metromover stations, which connect to the Metrorail at Government Center and Brickell stations. The architect is Revuelta Vega Leon.

See also 

 List of tallest buildings in Miami
 Downtown Miami
 List of tallest buildings in Florida

References 

 Riverfront West Complex on Emporis
 Mint at Riverfront on Emporis
 Ivy at Riverfront on Emporis
 Riverfront Phase III on Emporis
 Riverfront Phase IV on Emporis

External links 

 Pasco Breaks Ground on Miami Riverfront Development Commercial Property News magazine
 Week in Review South

Residential buildings completed in 2008
Residential skyscrapers in Miami
Apartment buildings in Miami
Residential condominiums in Miami
2008 establishments in Florida